Snorri Steinn Guðjónsson (born 17 October 1981) is a former Icelandic handball player and the current coach of Valur. He also played for the Icelandic national handball team, winning the silver medal at the 2008 Summer Olympics and the bronze at the 2010 European Championships.

Gudjonsson has previously played for TV Grosswallstadt, GWD Minden, Rhein-Neckar Löwen and GOG.

References

1981 births
Living people
Snorri Gudjonsson
Handball players at the 2004 Summer Olympics
Handball players at the 2008 Summer Olympics
Handball players at the 2012 Summer Olympics
Snorri Gudjonsson
Snorri Gudjonsson
Recipients of the Order of the Falcon
Olympic medalists in handball
Medalists at the 2008 Summer Olympics
Snorri Gudjonsson
Handball-Bundesliga players
Expatriate handball players
Snorri Gudjonsson
Snorri Gudjonsson
Snorri Gudjonsson
Rhein-Neckar Löwen players
Snorri Gudjonsson